Shartouni or francizied Chartouni is a surname. Notable people with the surname include:

Habib Shartouni (born 1958), convicted assassin of the Lebanese president Bachir Gemayel
Salim Chartouni (born 1973), Mexican footballer and commentator